Thomas Arnold Herbert (1863 – 22 November 1940) was a British Liberal Party politician and barrister.

Background
He was a son of Professor Thomas Martin Herbert, Professor of Philosophy and Church History at the Lancashire Independent College, whose mother was sister of Ann and Jane Taylor, authors of Twinkle Twinkle Little Star. He was educated at Mill Hill School, Owens College, Manchester, and St John's College, Cambridge. He married in 1896, Elizabeth Goodier Haworth. She died in 1917.

Law career
Exhibitioner, Foundation Scholar and M’Mahon Law Student, Double First in Classical and Law Tripos, bracketed Senior in Law Tripos. In 1890 he was the winner of Yorke Prize of Cambridge University for 'The History of the Law of Prescription in England'. In 1891 he had this work published.  Equity Scholarship of the Inner Temple. He received a Call to the bar in 1889 and practised at the Chancery Bar. He was appointed a King's Counsel in 1913. He served as a Justice of the Peace in Buckinghamshire.

Political career
He served as Liberal MP for Wycombe from 1906 to 1910. Standing for the first time, he gained Wycombe from the Conservative at the 1906 General Election. He served just one parliamentary term before defending his seat at the January 1910 General Election, when the Conservative Sir Charles Alfred Cripps won the seat with a majority of 17%.

He did not stand for parliament again.

Electoral record

References

External links 
 
 

1863 births
1940 deaths
Liberal Party (UK) MPs for English constituencies
Alumni of St John's College, Cambridge
UK MPs 1906–1910